Eunoe rhizoicola is a scale worm described from Punta Arenas, Chile, at a depth of 4m.

Description
Number of segments 36; elytra 15 pairs. Dirty yellowish green (in formalin). Prostomium anterior margin comprising a pair of acute anterior projections. Lateral antennae inserted ventrally (beneath prostomium and median antenna). Elytra marginal fringe of papillae present. Notochaetae distinctly thicker than neurochaetae. Bidentate neurochaetae absent.

References

Phyllodocida
Endemic fauna of Chile